Qumbaşı (also, Kumbashi) is a village in the Lankaran Rayon of Azerbaijan. The village forms part of the municipality of Liman.

References 

Populated places in Lankaran District